Thomas Gray "The Mayor" Watkins, Jr. (born June 18, 1980) is an American former professional baseball third baseman and current coach. He is the third base coach for the Minnesota Twins of Major League Baseball (MLB). He played in MLB for the Twins. In  he served as manager of the Twins' Double-A affiliate, the Chattanooga Lookouts of the Southern League, after almost a decade as a  coach in the Twins' farm system.

Hometown favorite
Watkins was drafted by the Twins in the 38th round of the 1998 Major League Baseball draft from Riverdale High School in Fort Myers, Florida, and was a fan favorite during his two-year stint with the Twins high A affiliate, the Fort Myers Miracle (2002–2003). Watkins' popularity with Miracle fans translated into one of the more interesting promotions in minor league history when he was the subject of the "Tommy Watkins Bobble-Butt" late in the 2003 season.

It was while with the Miracle that Watkins became more of a utility player. In 2002, he made 41 appearances at shortstop, 33 at third base, 19 at second base and three in the outfield. In 2003, he made his debut as a first baseman (8 times), and played all three outfield positions (38 total appearances), as well as making 28 appearances at third, 17 at shortstop, and nine at second.

MLB debut
Watkins hit eight home runs his second season with the triple-A Rochester Red Wings to match his minor-league career high of eight home runs in 2004 with the New Britain Rock Cats (Double-A). Also in 2007, he reached a career high in batting average (.272), doubles (22) and RBIs (49).

The Twins promoted Watkins on August 8, 2007, from Triple-A Rochester. Twins general manager Terry Ryan announced his call-up while visiting the Red Wings; the news was very well received by his teammates.  Watkins spent ten years in the minors, all with the Twins, before making his major league debut.

Red Wings Manager Stan Cliburn stated that Watkins' promotion to the big leagues "was one of the most emotional call-ups [he had] ever been involved with." The announcement "set off a joyous celebration in the clubhouse, because of everyone's love, passion and respect for Tommy."

Watkins was the 14th player from the Red Wings to be promoted to the Minnesota Twins in 2007. He was with the Red Wings in Rochester, New York and joined the Twins in Kansas City, Missouri. Watkins made his major league debut on August 10, 2007. He recorded his first major league hit August 15, 2007, while playing the Seattle Mariners. He is the first player in Twins history to wear No. 61.

According to Twins manager Ron Gardenhire, "He has a good smile in his face and comes to play every day. You can play anywhere you put him, outfield, infield, so it will be fine to have him up there." Watkins played nine games, with his major league debut being as pinch-hitter, August 10 against the Los Angeles Angels. He started the remaining eight games he appeared in, all at third base (he shifted to shortstop for the last two innings of one game). His first hit was a single off Jarrod Washburn on August 15 at Seattle. He had ten hits in 28 at-bats, all of them singles. He scored two runs; his first on a Torii Hunter grand slam. His Major League journey ended on August 22 when he suffered a lower abdominal muscle strain.

Coaching
Watkins spent all of 2008 with Rochester, where he batted .219 with one home run and 18 RBIs in 76 games. He became a free agent at the end of the season, and in January 2009, he re-signed with the Twins. Watkins was batting .254 at Rochester when he accepted a coaching job in the Twins organization. He helped coach the Gulf Coast League Twins, managed by Jake Mauer, and Class A Fort Myers during home games for the remainder of the season, and in 2010, accepted a position as Batting Coach with the Midwest League's Beloit Snappers.  With the transfer from Beloit Snappers to the Cedar Rapids Kernels, batting coach Tommy Watkins continued his tenure with the Twins Organization.

After the 2018 season, the Twins named Watkins their major league first base coach.

References

External links

1980 births
Living people
African-American baseball coaches
African-American baseball players
Baseball coaches from Florida
Baseball players from Florida
Chattanooga Lookouts managers
Elizabethton Twins players
Fort Myers Miracle players
Gulf Coast Twins players
Major League Baseball first base coaches
Major League Baseball infielders
Minnesota Twins coaches
Minnesota Twins players
Minor league baseball coaches
New Britain Rock Cats players
Quad City River Bandits players
Rochester Red Wings players
Sportspeople from Fort Myers, Florida
21st-century African-American sportspeople
20th-century African-American people